The Aster Revolution or Chrysanthemum Revolution was a revolution in Hungary led by Count Mihály Károlyi in the aftermath of World War I which resulted in the foundation of the short-lived First Hungarian People's Republic.

The revolution was brought about by widespread protests as World War I wore on, from which Mihály Károlyi emerged as the leader of the newly proclaimed First Hungarian People's Republic that reigned between 16 November 1918 and 21 March 1919. Supporters of Károlyi, many of whom were demobilized soldiers, adopted the aster as the symbol of the revolution. After the victory of the revolution, Hungary declared its independence and, as a result, Austria-Hungary dissolved.

Background 
In the second half of 1918, the course of World War I turned decisively against the Central Powers. The German Spring Offensive collapsed by July, alongside the accompanied Austrian offensive on the Italian Front. In mid-September, the Entente broke through the Macedonian Front. Unable to halt their advance, Bulgaria capitulated on September 29, and Austrian military situation became untenable.

Over the course of the war, although Romania and Italy was promised large territorial concessions, there were differing opinions over the future dismemberment of Austria-Hungary (as in January 1918, Wilson's 14 points only demanded "autonomous development" of nationalities). However following failed attempts to negotiate a separate peace, and the growing influence of Italian-backed Czech and Southern Slavic demands, plans among Entente leaders increasingly tended towards the monarchy's dissolution. By Summer 1918 the Entente recognised the Czechoslovak National Council as the future government of an independent Czechoslovakia. Therefore Austro-Hungarian peace offers based on the 14 points were rejected.

As a final measure to salvage his empire, on 16 October Emperor Charles published the Völkermanifest, declaring the federalisation of the Austrian part of the empire, and legitimised the formation of National Councils. However, this only accelerated the collapse: by the end of October, most National Councils would declare their secession, including the Austrian Germans themselves.

In Hungary, on 17 October, the ruling Third Wekerle Government abolished the 1867 Compromise, retaining only a personal union with Austria. On the same day, former PM István Tisza declared the war "lost' in front of Parliament. Unable to cope with the situation, Wekerle resigned on 23 October. 

Charles (who was in Gödöllő during Wekerle's resignation, but had to return to Vienna due to the deteriorating situation) was inclined to nominate Károlyi as Prime Minister to stabilise the situation, but changed his mind following the advice of prominent Hungarian politicians, like Gyula Andrássy (then freshly nominated Joint Foreign Minister). Therefore, no new Prime Minister was nominated until 30 October. In the meantime, Archduke Joseph August of Austria was named homo regius, Governor of Hungary.

On 24 October, the Entente launched its final offensive on the Italian Front. Hungarian units of the already disintegrating army flooded the home front, destabilising the already precarious situation on the street.

Events
On the evening of Wekerle's resignation on 23 October, 1918, the Hungarian National Council was established made up of opposition forces, most prominent among them Mihály Károlyi and his Party of Independence and '48. It also included Oszkár Jászi's Radical Party and Ernő Garami's Social Democratic Party of Hungary. They set up their headquarters in Hotel Astoria in the center of Pest. Independent of them, on 25 October a Soldiers' Council was established by flight lieutenant Imre Csernyák. He was then nominated by the National Council to chairman of the committee of the armed forces on 27 October.

By then, protests erupted in the streets of Budapest in favour of the National Council, demanding the nomination of Károlyi as Prime Minister. On 28 October, 1918  the crowd (among them István Friedrich) attempted to march on Buda Castle, but were intercepted and fired upon by the police while crossing the Chain Bridge. This "Battle of the Chain Bridge" left 3 dead and over 50 injured, and it only inflamed the crowds. Géza Lukachich was tasked to keep order in Budapest. Although he was firmly set against the National Council, his forces quickly deserted under him, rendering him powerless to stop the revolution.

The trigger point came on 30 October, when the Emperor nominated János Hadik, an establishment politician as Prime Minister. Soldiers gathering on Gizella Tér (now Vörösmarty tér) swore oath to the National Council. They tore off the rose on their caps, replacing it with an aster, which quickly became a revolutionary symbol. Over the course of the day, the Soldiers' Council took over the strategic points of the city and freed poitical prisoners. Notably, on the initiative of Béla Szántó, they blocked the transport of two companies from Eastern Railway Station, who then turned to the revolution and looted the train cars for weapons. Unions halted rail traffic to and from Budapest, telephone exchanges, posts and banks were seized. Lukachich himself was arrested. By this point the National Council, which still wanted to avoid a violent confrontation, had lost control of the situation. They slept in Hotel Astoria, uncertain of the future. 

On 31 October, 1918, at 3.00 a.m János Hadik called up the Emperor and notified him of his resignation. He was Prime Minister for 17 hours, the shortest in Hungarian history. The Emperor relented, and nominated Károlyi as Prime Minister, and asked to form a government with the parties of the National Council.

István Tisza was assassinated later that day, in his villa near City Park. The circumstances of his murder are uncertain to this day.

Aftermath 
On 13 November, Charles issued a proclamation recognizing Hungary's right to determine the form of the state and withdrawing from Hungarian affairs of state. Károlyi's provisional government proclaimed the Hungarian People's Republic on 16 November 1918, with Károlyi named as provisional president.

The Hungarian Royal Honvéd army still had more than 1,400,000 soldiers when Mihály Károlyi was announced as prime minister of Hungary. Károlyi yielded to U.S. President Woodrow Wilson's demand for pacifism by ordering the disarmament of the Hungarian army. This happened under the direction of Béla Linder, minister of war in the Károlyi government. Due to the full disarmament of its army, Hungary was to remain without a national defence at a time of particular vulnerability. The Hungarian self-disarmament made the occupation of Hungary directly possible for the relatively small armies of Romania, the Franco-Serbian army and the armed forces of the newly established Czechoslovakia. During the rule of Károlyi's pacifist cabinet, Hungary rapidly lost control over approx. 75% of its former pre-WW1 territories (325 411 km²) without armed resistance and was subject to foreign occupation.

In March 1919, the republic was itself overthrown by a Communist putsch, which established the Hungarian Soviet Republic. Soviet Hungary soon collapsed due to internal discontent and a Romanian invasion and, after a brief revival of the People's Republic, the monarchy was restored, now as an independent country.

History

Timeline

See also
Carnation Revolution

References

20th-century revolutions
Revolutions in Hungary
1918 in Hungary
Conflicts in 1918
History of Austria-Hungary
Aftermath of World War I in Hungary
Revolutions of 1917–1923
Subsidiary conflicts of World War I